The Fifteenth Doctor will be the next incarnation of the Doctor, the protagonist of the BBC science fiction television series Doctor Who. He will be portrayed by Rwandan-Scottish actor Ncuti Gatwa. Gatwa is the first black actor and the fourth Scottish actor to lead the series.

Within the series' narrative, the Doctor is a millennia-old, alien Time Lord from the planet Gallifrey, with somewhat unknown origins, who travels in time and space in their TARDIS, frequently with companions. At the end of life, the Doctor regenerates; as a result, the physical appearance and personality of the Doctor changes. 

Gatwa had previously been announced as Jodie Whittaker's successor as the programme's lead, and many reports stated he would play the Fourteenth Doctor and that Whittaker's Thirteenth Doctor would regenerate into an incarnation portrayed by Gatwa. Upon Whittaker's final appearance as the character, she instead regenerated into a form seemingly identical to the Tenth Doctor. This character, portrayed by David Tennant, was confirmed to be the Fourteenth Doctor, with later clarification that Gatwa would actually portray the Fifteenth Doctor. 

His first episode as lead actor is set to air in the "festive period" of 2023, and the fourteenth series will screen in 2024.

Casting 
Before Gatwa's casting was announced, several actors and actresses were heavily rumoured to be taking over from Whittaker, including Hugh Grant, Michael Sheen, Kris Marshall, Richard Ayoade, Michaela Coel, Kelly Macdonald, and Lenny Henry. Davies' return also led to speculation that an actor he had previously worked with in other projects would join him as the Fourteenth Doctor, with Olly Alexander, Lydia West, Omari Douglas, T'Nia Miller and Fisayo Akinade ranking highly in bookies' odds. Rumours also circulated that David Tennant would reprise his role, having previously portrayed the Tenth Doctor during Davies' time as showrunner, or that Jo Martin, who debuted as the Fugitive Doctor during Whittaker's tenure, would be revealed as the Fourteenth incarnation.

On 8 May 2022, Gatwa posted an Instagram picture featuring two red heart emojis, a plus sign, and a blue box emoji. The post, alongside comments from incoming Doctor Who showrunner Russell T Davies, led to speculation that Gatwa had been cast as the Doctor. This was later confirmed that same day by the official Doctor Who Twitter account.

In an article released on the Doctor Who website, Gatwa said, "This role and show means so much to so many around the world, including myself, and each one of my incredibly talented predecessors has handled that unique responsibility and privilege with the utmost care. I will endeavour my utmost to do the same."

Davies added, "Ncuti dazzled us, seized hold of the Doctor and owned those TARDIS keys in seconds... I promise you, 2023 will be spectacular!"

Gatwa was initially announced to be playing the Fourteenth Doctor in May 2022 and would have taken over from English actress Jodie Whittaker in the role following a series of special episodes throughout 2022. During the special, "The Power of the Doctor", it was revealed following Whittaker's regeneration the Doctor had regenerated into David Tennant. Gatwa was confirmed to eventually be starring in the role as the Fifteenth Doctor, with executive producer Russell T Davies stating "The path to Ncuti's 15th Doctor is laden with mystery, horror, robots, puppets, danger and fun!" Gatwa appeared in character for the first time in the trailer for the 60th anniversary specials, that will precede his ascension to the lead role later in 2023.

Reception

Announcement 
Angus Robertson, Scotland's Culture Secretary, congratulated Gatwa on his casting. Fellow actor Olly Alexander, thought to be among the front-runners for the role, tweeted his joy at the casting. Fellow Scot Sylvester McCoy, who portrayed the Seventh Doctor, tweeted his pleasure over another Scottish actor taking the reins of the Doctor. At the 2022 Paris Fan Festival, Matt Smith, who portrayed the Eleventh Doctor, openly expressed his support to Gatwa taking on the role. In an interview with STV News, Peter Capaldi, who portrayed the Twelfth Doctor, stated that he believed that Gatwa would be "an amazing Doctor." During the 2022 British Academy Television Awards, Gatwa stated that David Tennant, who portrayed the Tenth and Fourteenth Doctors, and Jodie Whittaker, who played the Thirteenth Doctor, both called him to express their support.

References

15
Male characters in television
Black people in television